The equestrian statue of Henry Warner Slocum is a monumental statue in Brooklyn's Grand Army Plaza, in New York City. The equestrian statue, designed by sculptor Frederick William MacMonnies, was dedicated in 1905 in honor of Henry Warner Slocum, who served as a general in the Union Army during the American Civil War and later as a U.S. Representative from the state of New York.

History

Background 

Henry Warner Slocum was born in Delphi Falls, New York in 1826. After attending the Cazenovia Seminary and the State Normal School at Albany, he enrolled in the United States Military Academy in 1848. Graduating four years later, he would go on to serve as an officer in the United States Army until the 1850s, when he resigned to practice law and participate in local and state politics. At the outbreak of the American Civil War in 1861, he resumed his military career and served as an officer in the Union Army, rising to the rank of major general by the end of the war. He participated in several major battles, including the First Battle of Bull Run, the Battle of Gaines' Mill, and the Battle of Gettysburg. Following the war, he moved to Brooklyn, New York, where he served several terms as a member of the United States House of Representatives. He died in 1894 in New York City.

Creation 
Following his death, several Brooklynites began to organize efforts to erect a monument in the city in his honor, with the location of the monument to be determined by the municipal authorities. While planned to initially be funded through donations, it was soon decided that public funds would be used. In 1895, the city government of Brooklyn passed a law allocating funds to the erection of the statue, the cost of which was not to exceed $30,000. American sculptor Frederick William MacMonnies, who at the time was operating out of Paris, was contracted to design the statue. He completed the casting of the statue by 1900, and the statue was shipped to Brooklyn in 1902. However, the statue was kept in storage for some time as the pedestal and foundation were being prepared. The pedestal was designed by architect Stanford White, with the location of the monument being the intersection of Eastern Parkway and Bedford Avenue.

Dedication 
The monument's dedication ceremony occurred on Memorial Day, May 30, 1905. The largescale ceremony commenced with a playing of the song "Hail, Columbia", followed by an invocation by Bishop Frederick Burgess of the Episcopal Diocese of Long Island. Park commissioner Michael J. Kennedy then presented the statue, which was unveiled by the 6-year-old granddaughter of Slocum. The statue was then accepted by New York City Mayor George B. McClellan Jr. on behalf of the city of New York. "The Star-Spangled Banner" was then played before a keynote speech was given by President of the United States Theodore Roosevelt. A benediction was then given by Bishop Charles Edward McDonnell of the Roman Catholic Diocese of Brooklyn. The ceremony ended with a playing of "America", followed by a gun salute. A parade followed down the parkway, with Roosevelt reviewing it.

In 1924, the monument was moved to the intersection of 15th Street and Prospect Park West, and was again moved to its current location at Grand Army Plaza in 1928.

Design 
The monument consists of a bronze equestrian statue atop a granite pedestal. On either side of the pedestal are two large bronze medallions, while a bronze eagle with outstretched wings is affixed to the front. Slocum, holding a sword upward, faces to the right. The only inscription on the pedestal is the name "SLOCUM". The statue itself stands an additional  atop the pedestal. While initially facing west from the intersection of Eastern Parkway and Beford Avenue, the monument now stands at Grand Army Plaza, east of the Soldiers' and Sailors' Arch, near East Plaza Street, where it faces towards Central Library.

Art historian Kathryn Greenthal compares the "dramatic image" of Slocum raising his sword triumphantly to similar equestrian statues of the time, including Augustus Saint-Gaudens's General John Logan Memorial (dedicated in 1897). She claims that these statues are in the "European tradition" of such statues as Carlo Marochetti's Richard Coeur de Lion and Emmanuel Frémiet's Jeanne d'Arc.

See also

 1905 in art
 List of equestrian statues in the United States

References

Bibliography

External links 
 

1905 establishments in New York City
1905 sculptures
Equestrian statues in New York City
Monuments and memorials in Brooklyn
Grand Army Plaza
Outdoor sculptures in Brooklyn
Relocated buildings and structures in New York City
Sculptures of men in New York City